David Buchholz (born 5 August 1984) is a German former professional footballer who played as a goalkeeper.

References

External links
 
 

1984 births
Living people
German footballers
Association football goalkeepers
VfL Bochum II players
SC Preußen Münster players
FC 08 Homburg players
Sportfreunde Lotte players
SV 19 Straelen players
VfL Osnabrück players
Regionalliga players
3. Liga players
Sportspeople from Guben
Footballers from Brandenburg